The 1912 Haskell Indians football team was an American football team that represented the Haskell Indian Institute (now known as Haskell Indian Nations University) as an independent during the 1912 college football season. In its second season under head coach A. R. Kennedy, Haskell compiled a 7–4 record and outscored opponents by a total of 209 to 94. The team lost close games to Kansas State, Texas, and undefeated Christian Brothers.

Leo Roque was the team's best all-around player and won a place on the All-Kansas football team for 1912. Bill Mzhicteno was named to the All-Kansas second team. The team captain Williams and John Artichoker were named to the third team.

Schedule

References

Haskell
Haskell Indian Nations Fighting Indians football seasons
Haskell Indians football